Augustin Lesieux (1877 in Sombrin – 1964) was a French sculptor.

He studied at the École des Beaux-Arts in Arras from 1896 to 1899 and then at Lille before finishing his studies at the École des Beaux-Arts in Paris. From 1901 he worked in Rodin's studio. After the 1914-1918 war he worked on many monument aux morts and completed numerous other public works.

Monument aux morts

Lesieux carried out the sculptural work on the following monument aux morts.

Other works

Notes

1877 births
1964 deaths
20th-century French sculptors
French male sculptors